Belur is a town and taluk in Hassan district in the state of Karnataka, India. The town is renowned for its Chennakeshava Temple dedicated to Vishnu, one of the finest examples of Hoysala architecture and the largest Hindu temple complex that has survived from pre-14th-century Karnata-Dravida tradition. A historic site inspired by the teachings of Ramanujacharya, it has been a Vaishnava Hindu pilgrimage center since at least the 12th century. It was also the first capital of the Hoysala dynasty, before they built Dwarasamudra (modern Halebid).

Belur is also Town Municipal Council and taluka. The Hoysala monuments at Belur and Halebidu have been proposed as UNESCO World Heritage Sites.

Geography
Belur is situated on the banks of Yagachi River in the Hassan district of south Karnataka. Hassan and Chikmagalur are the closest cities near Belur that are connected by a railway network to major cities of Karnataka. NH-73, its subsidary NH-373, SH-57, SH-110 & SH-112 pass through the town of Belur.

There are regular buses to Belur from Bengaluru (222 km), Chikmagalur (25 km), Halebidu (16 km), Kadur (62 km), Hassan (40 km), Hospet (330 km), Mangalore (124 km), Mysore (149 km), Shivamogga (132 km) to Belur. Belur is a small town and most hotels are near Chikmagalur and Hassan city on the Belur road (State Highway 57), Halebidu road (State Highway 21).

History
Belur is near the foothills east of the Western Ghats, at an altitude of 3,200 feet. It and the nearby Halebidu are well connected to northern Karnataka, western Andhra Pradesh and northern Tamil Nadu. Around this region, between the 10th and 14th century, the Hoysaḷa dynasty came to power, whose history is unclear. By their own 11th and 12th-century inscriptions, they were descendants of the Krishna-Baladeva-roots and the Yadavas of Maharashtra. They married into the Kalyana Chalukya Hindu dynasty, known for its temple and art tradition. The reliability of these inscriptions have been questioned as potential mythistory by some historians, who propose that the Hoysalas were a local Hindu family – a hill chief from the Western Ghats remembered for having killed a tiger or a lion, and they seized power and over time expanded their territory starting in the 10th century.

Belur was the early capital of the Hoysala Empire in the 11th-century, before they built Dorasamudra (modern Halebid). According to inscriptions discovered here, it was called Velur or Velapuri during the Hoysala era. Belur remained a laternate capital through the 14th century. The city was esteemed by the Hoysalas, and they referred to it as "earthly Vaikuntha" (Vishnu's abode) and "Dakshina Varanasi" (southern holy city of Hindus) in later inscriptions. In early 12th-century, the Hoysala king Vishnuvardhana met the Hindu philosopher Ramanujacharya – famed for his ideas on Sri Vaishnavism. Belur's profile rose thereafter, becoming a Vaishnava temples and monasteries town. It has remained a Vaishnava Hindu pilgrimage center.

Monuments
Belur is home to several monuments: 

Chennakeshava Temple, Belur – a large Vishnu-related Hoysala Hindu temples complex from the early 12th century. The main temple was originally called the Vijaya-Narayana temple built by the king, which is surrounded by many smaller temples built by a Hoysala queen, generals and merchants of Hoysalas, an attached monastery, Brahmins residences, a simple pushkarini (temple water tank), a pilgrim's choultry, kitchen and grains storage. The towering Belur gopura is visible from a distance.
Sankaresvara temple – the oldest temple in Belur, predates the Vishnuvardhana's Chennakeshava temples complex. The temple has a phamsana style shikara, square architectural plan, notable sukhanasi, much simpler artwork, with ruins of its mandapa scattered nearby. 
Amrutheswara temple ruins – a temple with a large temple tank, it was restored and expanded with a mandapa during the Vijayanagara-Nayaka period, but damaged and its parts scattered after the fall of Vijayanagara. It provides a contrast between the Hoysala and Vijayanagara architectural styles.

World heritage and tourism
The Belur monuments, along with those at Halebidu are on the pending list of UNESCO World Heritage Sites.

Nearby sites

Hoysaleswara Temple, Halebidu: it is 16 km from Belur, was capital of Hoysala and it was formerly called as Dwarasamudra. It has another famed collection of Hindu and Jain temples showing 12th century Hoysala architecture and artwork.
Bucesvara Temple, Koravangala – a twin temple near Hassan city that synthesizes the pre-Hoysala traditions of Hindu architecture, includes artwork from all three major Hindu traditions
Nageshvara-Chennakeshava Temple complex, Mosale – another major temple complex near Hassan city that presents Shaivism and Vaishnavism traditions together
Veera Narayana Temple, Belavadi – a major three sanctum temples complex, about 25 kilometers from Belur, with beautiful carvings, preserved Vesara superstructure and a galaxy of artwork from all Hindu traditions
Ishvara Temple, Arasikere – a Vesara and Hoysala architecture Hindu temple for Shiva that illustrates the dome-style Hindu architecture for mandapa built about a hundred years before the first invasion of Delhi Sultanate and the start of Deccan version of the Indo-Islamic architecture. It is about 60 kilometers east of Belur.
Lakshmi Devi Temple, Doddagaddavalli – one of the earliest Hoysala temples, four sanctums and beautifully carved
Nuggehalli group of temples – about 80 kilometers to the east of Belur, with an ingenious structure that makes three sanctums appear as one sanctum from outside; a Vesara architecture from the 13th-century

Gallery

References

External links

 

Tourist attractions in Hassan district
Former capital cities in India
Cities and towns in Hassan district